Morgan Parker (born 1974) is an Australian real estate executive and philanthropic adventurer who founded the non-profit organization Wheel2Wheel. He is COO at Dubai Holding Responsible for the creation of the $20 billion (US dollars) city center of Dubai, and also a board member serving the government in the development of the Australia’s only greenfield CBD. He is the former CEO of Rose Rock Group, a private equity firm established by the Rockefeller family, and former president of Taubman Asia, a unit of The Taubman Company LLC.
 
In 2011, Parker undertook a motorcycle adventure for Wheel2Wheel in support of grassroots charities. He rode solo from Hong Kong to Brisbane through ten countries, travelling 25,000 kilometers over 125 days to raise money and awareness for ten organizations. The adventure was filmed and became a ten-episode television documentary series which aired on National Geographic Channel globally.

Early life
Morgan Parker grew up in Brisbane, Australia.  He attended Brisbane Boys' College. He was subsequently awarded a scholarship to study Law at Bond University and completed his degree in 1994 at 19 years of age.

Career
Parker’s career started on Australia’s Sunshine Coast in the midst of the economic expansionism of the mid-1990s.  As a real estate banker, he was involved in numerous projects that delivered growth in employment, tourism infrastructure, and business opportunities for the emerging peri-urban region. Parker’s early success in Australia initiated his trajectory to becoming one of Asia-Pacific’s most respected real estate executives.

He worked in Asian markets and lived in China, Japan, Korea, Indonesia, Singapore, Taiwan, and Hong Kong from 1996 to 2015. Parker worked in senior management positions with Macquarie Bank, Lend Lease, Morgan Stanley, Taubman Centers and Rock Rose across Asia. He became noted for a rock-star-like appearance and being a thought-leader in the Asian real estate industry. Parker is associated with new city developments such as Songdo in South Korea and Yujiapu in China; mixed-use projects including Taipei 101 and Macau Studio City; and office buildings Aurora Place in Sydney and Citigroup Tower in Shanghai.  He was involved in many notable transactions for Morgan Stanley’s Real Estate Fund during its prolific early 2000s investing spree across Asia. Parker is a former board member of the Asia Public Real Estate Association and serves on the Asia board of the International Council of Shopping Centers.

In 2015 Parker’s focus shifted to the Middle-East, specifically Dubai where he took up a leadership role at the private investment holding company of Sheikh Mohammed bin Rashid Al Maktoum - Prime Minister and Vice President of the UAE and Ruler of Dubai.  He was given responsibility for developing a prime 400 acre land parcel into the future center of the city – Jumeriah Central.  The new district’s master plan was recognized as the world’s best by RLI Global in 2017. The district comprises 250 individual building projects.

Parker has spoken at over 60 conferences, featured in over 300 media articles and dozens of television segments. He has lectured at various universities, and published for the Urban Land Institute and International Council of Shopping Centers. He mentors young executives and matriculating university graduates as they navigate the competitive work environment and determine viable career pathways.

Personal life 

Parker is married to Levina Poon and has two children.  They live between homes in Dubai, Hong Kong and Noosa, Australia.

Parker has been featured in over 300 media articles and dozens of television segments. Parker speaks regularly at industry conferences and as an inspirational speaker at schools and corporations globally.

In 2009, Parker founded non-profit organization Wheel2Wheel to raise awareness and facilitate financial assistance to charitable organizations throughout Asia-Pacific. Wheel2Wheel achieves this by undertaking research on humanitarian issues and charities, staging expeditions, then producing documentary television series for global broadcast. In his first ride Parker rode from Hong Kong to Brisbane, visiting 10 charities and covering 25,000 kilometres in 125 days.

References 

Australian philanthropists
Australian expatriates in Hong Kong
Living people
People from Brisbane
Australian real estate businesspeople
1974 births
St. George's School (Rhode Island) alumni